The list of ship commissionings in 1889 includes a chronological list of all ships commissioned in 1889.


See also 

1889
 Ship commissionings